Roman Rashitovich Khassanov (born 7 September 1996) is a Kazakhstani tennis player.

Khassanov has a career high ATP singles ranking of 671 achieved on 7 May 2018. He also has a career high ATP doubles ranking of 686 achieved on 22 May 2017.

Khassanov represents Kazakhstan at the Davis Cup, where he has a W/L record of 0–1.

Future and Challenger finals

Singles: 1 (1–0)

Doubles 5 (1–4)

Davis Cup

Participations: (0–1)

   indicates the outcome of the Davis Cup match followed by the score, date, place of event, the zonal classification and its phase, and the court surface.

External links

1996 births
Living people
Kazakhstani male tennis players
People from Shymkent
Sportspeople from Astana
21st-century Kazakhstani people